The American Registry for Diagnostic Medical Sonography (ARDMS), incorporated in June 1975, is an independent nonprofit organization that administers examinations and awards credentials in the areas of diagnostic medical sonography, diagnostic cardiac sonography, vascular technology,
physicians’ vascular interpretation, musculoskeletal sonography and midwifery ultrasound. ARDMS has over 90,000 certified individuals in the U.S., Canada and throughout the world. ARDMS provides certifications, resources, and career information to healthcare practitioners and students practicing medical sonography.

Mission statement 
“ARDMS promotes quality care and patient safety through the certification and continuing competency of ultrasound professionals.”

Governance 
ARDMS is governed by a board of directors composed of sonographers, vascular technologists, physicians, research scientists and a public member. The board creates the policies and defines the direction; the Exam Development Task Forces (EDTFs) conduct continuous evaluations of the material contained in the examinations.

Examination development 
The examinations are developed by subject matter experts who sit on Exam Development Task Forces (EDTFs). The EDTFs survey job functions and practices in various specialties and develop test questions based upon a blueprint of job tasks in sonography. EDTFs are composed of sonographers, vascular technologists, physicians, and scientists. The members of each EDTF are knowledgeable in the subject area of the particular examination.

As a global organization, ARDMS examinations are being delivered at test center locations in 27 countries. ARDMS has Registrants in 70 countries.

ARDMS credentialing programs (RDMS, RDCS, RVT, and RPVI) have earned the ANSI-ISO 17024 accreditation through the International Organization for Standardization and the American National Standards Institute. The organization is the recognized international standard in sonography credentialing.

Certifications awarded by ARDMS 
Registered Diagnostic Medical Sonographer (RDMS): To obtain the RDMS credential, applicants must meet the required prerequisites and must pass two examinations — the Sonography Principles and Instrumentation (SPI) examination, which tests basic physical principles and instrumentation knowledge, and one specialty examination. Specialty areas include Abdomen (AB), Breast (BR), Fetal Echocardiography (FE), Obstetrics and Gynecology (OB/GYN) and Pediatric Sonography (PS).

Registered Diagnostic Cardiac Sonographer (RDCS): Applicants seeking the RDCS credential must meet the required prerequisites and must pass two examinations — the SPI examination and a specialty exam in one of the following areas: Adult Echocardiography (AE), Pediatric Echocardiography (PE) or Fetal Echocardiography (FE).

Registered Vascular Technologist (RVT): To qualify for the RVT credential, applicants must meet examination prerequisites and pass the SPI and Vascular Technology (VT) examinations.

Registered Musculoskeletal Sonographer (RMSKS): Applicants seeking the RMSKS credential must meet the required prerequisites and must pass two examinations — the SPI examination and the Musculoskeletal Sonographer (MSKS) examination.

Registered Physician in Vascular Interpretation (RPVI): The RPVI credential is offered exclusively to physicians. To qualify for the RPVI credential, applicants must meet examination prerequisites and pass the Physician’ Vascular Interpretation (PVI) examination.

Registered in Musculoskeletal Sonography (RMSK): The RMSK credential is available to physicians and advanced care providers. To earn this credential, applicants must pass the Musculoskeletal (MSK) Sonography examination.

Certification Recognition 
Credentials awarded by ARDMS are widely recognized in the medical community by sonographic and vascular professional organizations, including:
 American College of Radiology (ACR)
 American Institute of Ultrasound in Medicine (AIUM)
 American Society of Echocardiography (ASE)
 Commission on Accreditation of Allied Health Education Programs (CAAHEP)
 Intersocietal Accreditation Commission (IAC)
 Society of Diagnostic Medical Sonography (SDMS)
 Society for Vascular Surgery (SVS)
 Society for Vascular Ultrasound (SVU)
 World Federation for Ultrasound in Medicine and Biology (WFUMB)

See also
Medical ultrasound

References

External links 
 ARDMS Website

Diagnostic cardiology
Medical ultrasonography
Medical and health organizations based in Maryland
Medical associations based in the United States